Connecticut Avenue is a light rail station that is currently under construction in Chevy Chase, Maryland. It will be part of the Purple Line in Maryland. The station will be located at the intersection of Connecticut Avenue and the Capital Crescent Trail.

History 
The Purple Line is under construction as of 2022 and is scheduled to open in 2026.

Station layout
The station consists of two side platforms.

References

Chevy Chase, Maryland
Purple Line (Maryland)
Railway stations in Montgomery County, Maryland
Railway stations scheduled to open in 2026